Day One was a planned NBC sci-fi television movie—originally a television series pilot—about apartment residents that survive an unknown worldwide cataclysm that destroys modern infrastructure. The movie/pilot was directed by Alex Graves, who previously directed the pilot episodes for the Fox television series Fringe and Journeyman. The show was originally expected to fill the Heroes time slot after the 2010 Olympics. It has been reported since that the show will never air.

Development
While originally intended to air on NBC midseason in the 2009–10 television season with a thirteen-episode order, it was reported on October 1, 2009, that the episode order had been reduced to four and would air as a mini-series. On January 10, 2010, it was announced that only the pilot would air, as a television movie. The NBC President of prime-time entertainment told the Television Critics Association that "it will be a pilot where you could see where it could go in series, but there will be a resolve at the end of the two hours. If the TV movie performs well the story may be continued." On May 16, 2010, Entertainment Weekly reported that the show would likely never air.

Cast
 Julie Gonzalo as Kelly – the lead character, who is struggling with guilt over failing to save her fiance's life.
 Derek Mio as a character caught in a hostage situation.
 Addison Timlin as a character caught in a hostage situation.
 Adam Campbell
 Catherine Dent
 David Lyons
 April Grace
 Carly Pope
 Thekla Reuten
 Xander Berkeley

References

External links
 
 

Post-apocalyptic television series
Television series by Universal Television
2000s American television miniseries
Television miniseries as pilots
Unaired television shows